Sphoerodes is a genus of beetles in the family Carabidae, containing the following species:

 Sphoerodes camerunus Basilewsky, 1951
 Sphoerodes gracilior Alluaud, 1917
 Sphoerodes impunctatus Bates, 1886
 Sphoerodes striatus (Dejean, 1831)

References

Licininae